Ó Maoláin is a Gaelic-Irish surname usually anglicised as Mullin, Mullins, Mullan, Mullane, Mallon, Moylan, Mullen and Mellon, any of which may have an "'O'" prefix.

Overview

There are at least three unrelated families of the name native to Ulster, with at least one further family, again unrelated, found in Munster in the County Cork-County Kerry region. The Ulster Ó Maoláin's were as follows:

 Ó Maoláin of Cianachta Glenn Geimin, a district of Tír Eoghain. Nowadays Mullin or Mullins.
 Ó Maoláin of Clones, County Monaghan. Nowadays anglicised as Mullin or Mellon.
 Ó Mealláin, anglicised as Mallon.

See also

 Mac Maoláin

References

 The Ulster Clans: O'Mullan, O'Kane and O'Mellan, T.H. Mullin, Belfast, 1966. Copy available at the National Library of Ireland (ir 9292 m 29).
 Siblings and descendants of Martha (McMullen) and James Robinson (1770-1/5/1845) of County Tyrone, Ireland, and their Irish and US descendants, Jamie Robinson, Smithfield, PA, c.1989 (Library of Congress, CS71.R66 1989).

Irish families
Surnames
Surnames of Irish origin
Irish-language surnames